Dean Hammond (born 9 July 1992) is a South African rugby union player who plays for English club Ealing Trailfinders in the RFU Championship.

Club career
Hammond represented Maties and Western Province between 2011 and 2013. He later joined Worcester Warriors academy from Western Province in September 2013. He was handed his Warriors debut at the end of that month, coming on as a replacement at Wasps. Hammond scoring his first try for the club in the Amlin Challenge Cup against Biarritz Olympique. Hammond played a significant part in Warriors' British and Irish Cup triumph in the 2014/15 season, scoring in the final against Doncaster Knights,  On 29 January 2016, Hammond signed a new professional contract with Worcester at the Sixways Stadium. He continued to progress during the 2015/16 season and scored three tries across six European Challenge Cup games. Hammond scored eight tries in 17 appearances during the 2016/17 campaign, including a hat-trick against Enisei-STM in January 2017. He made his 50th appearance for the club against Wasps.

On 12 June 2020, Hammond departs Worcester to sign for Ealing Trailfinders in the RFU Championship from the 2020–21 season.

International career
He has also played at the South Africa Sevens in 2011 and represented South Africa U20s that won the 2012 IRB Junior World Championship.

References

External links
Worcester Warriors Profile

South African rugby union players
1992 births
Living people
Worcester Warriors players
Rugby union centres
Rugby union players from East London, Eastern Cape